Qirdah is a town located in north west Libya, in the Sawfajjin Municipality which is located in the Tripolitania Region, and Misrata District. Qirdah is roughly 45km away from the Libyan Coastal Highway. Qirdah may also be subjected to the confluence of intermittent run-off from the Mediterranean, which may occur in colder months. The nearest major city is Abugrein, around 45km away. Within Qirdah there are two main sites of interest, the ancient city of Gerisa, and Al-Tahweed Mosque (Arabic: مسجد التوحيد).

References 

Populated places in Misrata District